Duplantin is a village in the Chardonnières commune of the Chardonnières Arrondissement, in the Sud department of Haiti.

References

Populated places in Sud (department)